

Chenla (550–802)

Khmer Empire (802–1431)

Cambodia (1431-present)

References

Cambodian monarchs
Khmer Empire
Cambodian